The Smoker You Drink, the Player You Get is the second studio album by American rock guitarist and singer Joe Walsh, released in 1973 by ABC-Dunhill Records in the United States and the United Kingdom, and was also released in Germany. It proved to be his commercial breakthrough, largely on the strength of the Top 40 hit single, "Rocky Mountain Way", which helped propel the album into the Top 10.

On this album, Walsh shares the vocals and songwriting with the other three members of Barnstorm: drummer/multi-instrumentalist Joe Vitale, bassist Kenny Passarelli, and new member, keyboardist Rocke Grace. As a result, a variety of styles are explored on this album; there are elements of blues, jazz, folk, pop, and even Caribbean music.  However, the album is only credited to Walsh as a solo artist, not to Barnstorm, which led to the band's demise. After the success of this album, Walsh continued making albums as a solo artist.

The title is a play on words "The higher you get the better you play!"

Cover artwork
The cover art for the album features a British Sopwith Snipe fighter with French colours that appears to be flying upside down (sky blue is at the bottom; brown ground is at the top).

Critical reception

Writing retrospectively for AllMusic, critic Ben Davies wrote of the album "Walsh's ability to swing wildly from one end of the rock scale to the other is unparalleled and makes for an album to suit many tastes... [it] features some of the most remembered Joe Walsh tracks, but it's not just these that make the album a success. Each of the nine tracks is a song to be proud of. This is a superb album by anyone's standards."

Release history
In addition to the usual two channel stereo version this album was also released in a four channel quadraphonic edition on LP and 8-track tape in 1974. The quad LP is encoded using the QS Regular Matrix system. Audio Fidelity issued a limited 24-karat gold edition CD in 2009. This was followed in 2011 by a version in Japan with a miniature replica of the original sleeve in the SHM-CD format.

Track listing
All songs written and composed by Joe Walsh, except where noted.

Different versions of the album have various spellings for two of the tracks. "(Day Dream) Prayer" is spelled "Daydream (Prayer)" on the CD versions, and "Book Ends" is spelled as "Bookends" on some other releases.

Personnel
Barnstorm
Joe Walsh – guitars, keyboards, synthesizer, backing vocals, lead vocals (on 1, 3, 6, 7, 9)
Kenny Passarelli – bass guitar, guitar, backing vocals, lead vocals (on 5)
Joe Vitale – drums, percussion, piano, keyboards, flute, backing vocals, lead vocals (on 2, 8)
Rocke Grace – keyboards, backing vocals

Session musicians
Joe Lala – percussion
Venetta Fields – backing vocals
Clydie King – backing vocals

Production and artwork
 Joe Walsh – record producer
 Bill Szymczyk – record producer, engineering, mixing
 Mike D. Stone of the Record Plant - engineering
 Ronnie Alpert – engineering 
 Al Blazek – engineering
 Jimmy Wachtel – album design
 Bob Jenkins – photography

Charts
Album – Billboard (United States)

Singles – Billboard (United States)

Certifications
 UK-Silver 
 US-Gold

See also
 List of albums released in 1973
 Joe Walsh's discography

References

External links

Joe Walsh albums
1973 albums
Albums produced by Bill Szymczyk
Albums produced by Joe Walsh
Albums with cover art by Jimmy Wachtel
ABC Records albums
Dunhill Records albums
Probe Records albums